Brandur Hendriksson Olsen (born 19 December 1995) is a Faroese professional footballer who plays as a midfielder for Superettan club Helsingborgs IF and the Faroe Islands national team.

Club career

FC Copenhagen
In September 2014, after some impressive performances while captaining the reserves, Hendriksson signed professional terms with FC Copenhagen and was given squad number 36. Hendriksson was included in the matchday squad for the first time for the Danish Superliga home match against FC Midtjylland on 15 August 2014, although he remained on the bench. On 30 October 2014 he made his first team debut for F.C. Copenhagen in the cup match against FC Roskilde.

On 13 April 2015, Olsen made his first appearance for F.C. Copenhagen in the Danish Superliga, coming in as a substitute in an away win against Silkeborg. On 14 May 2015, Hendriksson scored the winning goal for F.C. Copenhagen in a 3–2 extra-time win against FC Vestsjælland in the  2014–15 Danish Cup Final, after coming off the bench in the 84th minute. Two weeks later Hendriksson scored the winning goal again from a freekick in a 1–0 win against Odense Boldklub, which secured F.C. Copenhagen a second-placed finish in the Danish league.

Vendsyssel FF
On 22 December 2015 it was confirmed, that Olsen, who struggled with gaining playing time in Copenhagen, had signed a loan contract for the rest of the season with the Danish 1st Division-club, Vendsyssel FF.

Randers FC
In July 2016, Hendriksson signed a three-year deal with Danish Superliga club Randers FC. Making him the third Faroese player to sign for a Danish top division team in 2016, after his former Vendsyssel FF teammate Hallur Hansson was signed by AC Horsens and Jóan Símun Edmundsson was signed by Odense Boldklub

FH
On 21 April 2018, Hendriksson immediately joined Icelandic club FH.

International career
Hendriksson, described by several figures in the game as one of the brightest prospects, to come through in Faroese football in recent years, made his full international debut for the Faroe Islands national football team on 11 October 2014, coming off the bench in the second half of the UEFA Euro 2016 qualifier against Northern Ireland at Windsor Park. On 14 October 2014, he was in the starting line up for the Euro qualifier against Hungary at Tórsvøllur, the Faroe Islands national football stadium. Playing in the number 10 role, Hendriksson impressed with his range of passing, his creative ability and his general high energy performance. He played the full 90 minutes and afterwards received very positive reviews from the Faroese media.

On 13 June 2015, Hendriksson scored his first international goal in a 2–1 win over former European champions Greece.

International goals
Scores and results list Faroe Islands' goal tally first.

Honours

Club
Copenhagen
 Danish Cup: 2014–15

Olsen or Hendriksson 
Since Olsen is a very common surname in Denmark, Brandur Hendriksson Olsen since June 2015 calls himself Brandur Hendriksson when playing football; he has the name Hendriksson on the back of his shirt both when he plays for FC Copenhagen and when he plays for the Faroese national football team. He said to Danish media, that he has always had Hendriksson as his middle name and he thought that is sounded more Faroese than Olsen and he also wanted to make his father proud, as his father's first name is Hendrik.

References

External links 
  Vendsyssel profile
  Olsens's profile on faroesoccer.com ("Landsdystir" means "matches for national teams")
 Profile at Football-Lineups.com

1995 births
Living people
Faroese footballers
Association football midfielders
F.C. Copenhagen players
Vendsyssel FF players
Randers FC players
Fimleikafélag Hafnarfjarðar players
Helsingborgs IF players
Danish Superliga players
Danish 1st Division players
Úrvalsdeild karla (football) players
Faroe Islands youth international footballers
Faroe Islands under-21 international footballers
Faroe Islands international footballers
Faroese expatriate footballers
Faroese expatriate sportspeople in Iceland
Faroese expatriate sportspeople in Sweden
Expatriate men's footballers in Denmark
Expatriate footballers in Iceland
Expatriate footballers in Sweden